Mark Allen may refer to:

Mark Allen (businessman) (born 1950), former British spy turned businessman and lecturer
Mark Allen (triathlete) (born 1958), American world champion triathlete
Bull Allen (rugby union) (Mark Richard Allen, born 1967), New Zealand international rugby football player
Mark Allen (snooker player) (born 1986), Northern Irish snooker player
Mark Allen (footballer) (born 1963), former Burnley, Tranmere Rovers and Runcorn football player
Mark Allen (software developer), computer game programmer and designer
Mark Allen (DJ), British deejay and producer
Mark Allen (politician), American politician from Oklahoma
Mark G. Allen (born 1962), professor specializing in microfabrication at the Georgia Institute of Technology
Mark S. Allen (born 1965), American television host
Mark W. Allen, American lumber dealer and politician
Mark Johnston-Allen (born 1968), snooker player
Mark Allen, founder of Machine Project

See also
Mark Allan, the comics character Molten Man
Mark van Allen (born 1954), musician, recording engineer and producer
Marcus Allen (disambiguation)